Ali Golmoradi (Persian: علی گلمرادی ; born 1970, Darreh Shahr, Iran) is a politician and member of the tenth term of the Iran Islamic Parliament.

References 

1970 births
Living people
Iranian politicians
Members of the 10th Islamic Consultative Assembly